Ozyptila ladina is a species of crab spiders found in Italy.

References

External links 

ladina
Spiders of Europe
Spiders described in 1998